There have been pride parades in South Africa celebrating LGBT pride since 1990. South African pride parades were historically used for political advocacy protesting against legal discrimination against LGBT people, and for the celebration of equality before the law after the apartheid era. They are increasingly used for political advocacy against LGBT hate crimes, such as the so-called corrective rape of lesbians in townships, and to remember victims thereof.

Johannesburg

The Gay and Lesbian Organisation of the Witwatersrand (GLOW) was founded by gay anti-apartheid activist Simon Nkoli in 1988. The first South African pride parade was held towards the end of the apartheid era in Johannesburg on 13 October 1990, the first such event on the African continent. The first event attended by 800 people was initiated and organised by GLOW, and the crowd was addressed by Nkoli, Donné Rundle, Beverly Ditsie, Edwin Cameron and gay Dutch Reformed Church minister Hendrik Pretorius. In his speech, Nkoli said:

Section Nine of the country's 1996 Constitution provides for equality and freedom from discrimination on the grounds of sexual orientation among other factors. Over time, the celebration factor came to overshadow the protest factor despite ongoing social issues. The 2012 parade was marred by a clash between activist participants and members of the Joburg Pride organising body, and the organising body disbanded in April 2013 due to internal conflict about whether the event should continue to be used for political advocacy. Two new committees were formed around May 2013. One of them was called "Johannesburg Pride" and would carry on the history of the oldest and largest LGBTQIA Pride in South Africa & (Africa), The other committee would organise a "Johannesburg People's Pride", which is "envisioned as an inclusive and explicitly political movement for social justice". As of June 2019, Johannesburg Pride is the largest Pride event in Africa.

Cape Town

Annual pride parades have been held in Cape Town subject to interruptions since 1993, and as part of the Cape Town Pride event since 2001.

The Mother City Queer Project (MCQP) costume party has also been held annually in Cape Town (nicknamed the Mother City) since 1994.

Other areas
Eastern Cape:
Nelson Mandela Bay Pride has taken place annually in Port Elizabeth since 2011.

Free State:
Free State Pride has been held in Bloemfontein, one of South Africa's three national capitals, since 2012.

Gauteng:
Other pride parades held in the Johannesburg area include Soweto Pride which has taken place annually since 2005 in Meadowlands, Soweto, and Ekurhuleni Pride which has taken place annually since 2009 in the East Rand township of KwaThema. On 24 April 2011, LGBT rights activist and Ekurhuleni Pride Organising Committee member Noxolo Nogwaza was raped and murdered in KwaThema, in what was described as a hate crime by Human Rights Watch and Amnesty International. Three years earlier, lesbian Banyana Banyana footballer Eudy Simelane was raped and murdered in the same township. In 2016, Ekurhuleni Pride took place in the township of Vosloorus. Since then, the event has been held in Centurion and KwaThema.

Pretoria Pride has been held annually in Pretoria, South Africa's executive capital, since 2013.

KwaZulu-Natal:
Durban Pride has been held every year in Durban, the largest city in the province, since 2011.

The Pink Mynah Festival is held in Pietermaritzburg, the provincial capital, in October. The event includes a beauty pageant, a fashion show, a pride parade and a picnic.

Limpopo:
Limpopo Pride has been held in Polokwane since 2012. In 2015, various government officials, including the mayors of Polokwane and the Capricorn District Municipality as well as councillors and members of the police service, marched in the parade.

Mpumalanga:
On 9 August 2014, a pride parade took place in Nelspruit. This marked the first time a pride parade was held in the province of Mpumalanga. One month later, on 6 September 2014, the town of Ermelo organised its first pride parade.

North West:
The first pride parade in the province was held in November 2007 in Mahikeng, the provincial capital.

Pride parades have taken place annually in Klerksdorp since 2010.

On 1 October 2016, a pride parade was held in the township of Kanana.

Western Cape:
The Pink Loerie Mardi Gras has been held in Knysna since 2001.

The Khumbulani Pride ("Remember Pride"), which aims to honour the lives of LGBT people lost in hate violence in the Western Cape, has taken place in different townships in the province every year since 2013. In 2013, it was held in Gugulethu and remembered hate crime victims such as 19-year-old Zoliswa Nkonyana who was stabbed and stoned to death in Khayelitsha in 2006 for living openly as a lesbian. In 2014 and 2015, it took place in the townships of Samora Michel and Khayelitsha, respectively. In 2016, the event was held in the township of Langa. Since then, the event has been held in Strand and Delft.

See also
LGBT rights in South Africa
List of LGBT events in South Africa
Gay pride flag of South Africa

References

External links 

 
 
 
 
 
 
 PFLAG South Africa

1990 establishments in South Africa

Recurring events established in 1990
South African culture